Promyllantor atlanticus is an eel in the family Congridae (conger/garden eels). It was described by Emma Stanislavovna Karmovskaya in 2006. It is a marine, deep water-dwelling eel which is known from the Republic of Congo, in the southeastern Atlantic Ocean (from which its species epithet is derived).

References

Congridae
Fish described in 2006